Saladinli (also, Saladinli) is a village and municipality in the Tovuz Rayon of Azerbaijan.  It has a population of 467.

References 

Populated places in Tovuz District